The 1998 Southern Miss Golden Eagles football team represented the University of Southern Mississippi in the 1998 NCAA Division I-A football season. The Golden Eagles were led by ninth-year head coach Jeff Bower and played their home games at M. M. Roberts Stadium. Following a successful 1997 season, the Golden Eagles were ranked in the preseason for the first time in school history, 21st in both polls. However, they were unable to replicate the previous season's success, losing their opening two games to ranked opponents and started 1–3. They finished with an overall record of 7–5 (5–1 C-USA), finishing second in Conference USA. They were invited to the 1998 Humanitarian Bowl, where they lost to Idaho, 35–42.

Schedule

Rankings

 This season was the first time the Golden Eagles were ranked in the preseason.

References

Southern Miss
Southern Miss Golden Eagles football seasons
Southern Miss Golden Eagles football